is a professional Japanese professional baseball pitcher for the Saitama Seibu Lions of Nippon Professional Baseball (NPB). Hirai was selected in the 5th round in the 2016 Nippon Professional Baseball draft. In the 2019 NPB season, Hirai appeared in 81 games, breaking the Pacific League Record for most games pitched, previously held by Kazuhisa Inao.

References

External links

 NPB.com

1991 births
Living people
Baseball people from Aichi Prefecture
Japanese baseball players
Nippon Professional Baseball pitchers
Saitama Seibu Lions players
People from Ichinomiya, Aichi